Greatest Hits is a compilation album by Ruff Endz released on Epic Records in 2003.

Track listing
No More
Someone To Love You
You Mean The World To Me
Will You Be Mine
If I Was The One
Where Does Love Go From Here
Sure Thing
I Apologize
Cash, Money, Cars, Clothes (featuring Memphis Bleek)
Shake It
You
Threesome

2003 greatest hits albums
Ruff Endz albums